Mindcage is a 2022 American mystery thriller film directed by Mauro Borrelli and starring Martin Lawrence, Melissa Roxburgh, John Malkovich, Robert Knepper, Jacob Grodnik and Aiden Turner. It was released through VOD and in select theatres on December 16, 2022. The film marks Lawrence's first major non-comedic role.

Synopsis 
When a copycat murderer strikes, Detectives Jake Doyle and Mary Kelly seek help from an incarcerated serial killer called "the Artist". As Mary delves deep into the Artist's brilliant but twisted psyche, she and Jake get lured into a diabolical game of cat and mouse, racing against time to stay one step ahead of both criminals.

Cast 
 Martin Lawrence as Jake Doyle
 Melissa Roxburgh as Mary Kelly
 John Malkovich as Arnaud Leferve aka 'The Artist'
 Robert Knepper as Sheriff Owings
 Neb Chupin as Dr. Loesch
 Jacob Grodnik as Dutch
 Chris Mullinax as Homeless Man
 Ritchie Montgomery as Father Linares
 Nellie Scuitto as Lt. Governor Diaz
 Aiden Turner as Dale
 Cassandra Gava as Voodoo Priestess

Production 
Filming occurred in Springdale, Arkansas, and Fayetteville, Arkansas, in August 2021.

That same month, it was announced that SAG-AFTRA had issued a "Do Not Work" notice to the filmmakers due to COVID-19 concerns. The notice was rescinded on August 13, 2021.

The film's first trailer was released on November 7, 2022.

Reception
The film has a 20% rating on Rotten Tomatoes based on ten reviews.

References

External links 
 American police detective films
 

American serial killer films
American thriller films
Films directed by Mauro Borrelli
Films shot in Arkansas
2022 films